Overexposed is a 1990 American thriller film.

Plot
Morrison (Larry Brand) investigates when the colleagues of beautiful soap star Kristin (Catherine Oxenberg) start disappearing. Morrison realizes Kristin herself is being stalked and needs protection from the invisible threat.

Cast
 Catherine Oxenberg as Kristin
 Larry Brand as Morrison 
 David Naughton as Phillip
 Karen Black as Mrs Trowbridge
 Jennifer Edwards as Helen
 Barney Burman as Uniformed Officer 
 William Bumiller as Hank
 George Derby as Lt Bryce
 Brewster Gould as Jensen
 Ernest Alexander as Eugene
 Gil Christner as Liquor Store Owner

References

External links
 
 Overexposed at TCMDB
 Review of film at Los Angeles Times

1990 films
American thriller films
1990 thriller films
1990s English-language films
1990s American films